A comic book archive or comic book reader file (also called sequential image file) is a type of archive file for the purpose of sequential viewing of images, commonly for comic books. The idea was made popular by the CDisplay sequential image viewer; since then, many viewers for different platforms have been created.

Design 
Comic book archive is not a distinct file format. It is a filename extension naming convention.

The filename extension indicates the archive type used:
 .cb7 → 7z
 .cba → ACE
 .cbr → RAR
 .cbt → TAR
 .cbz → ZIP

Comic book archive files mainly consist of a series of image files with specific naming, typically PNG (lossless compression) or JPEG (lossy compression, not JPEG-LS or JPEG XT) files, stored as a single archive file. Occasionally GIF, BMP, and TIFF files are seen. Folders may be used to group images in a more logical layout within the archive, like book chapters.

Comic book archive viewers typically offer various dedicated functions to read the content, like one page forward/backwards, go to first/last page, zoom or print. Some applications support additional tag information in the form of embedded XML files in the archive or use of the ZIP comment to store additional information. These files can include additional information like artists, story information, table of contents or even a separate text layer for comic book translations.

Adoption

Windows
 Calibre e-book reader can view and convert comic archives to different formats
 CDisplay was the first application to support the CBR format.
 CDisplayEx, inspired by CDisplay with additional viewing features.
 Comic Seer (Desktop) is a comic book archive viewer and organizer for the desktop.
 Gonvisor is a comic reader simple to use with some features to improve image quality.
 STDU Viewer
 SumatraPDF

Mac
 Calibre can view, library manage and convert to different formats.

Android
 FBReader supports CBZ/CBR files on Android via the ComicBook plugin available from its website.
 Tachiyomi, a manga reader, supports CBZ/CBR files, but does not support CBR files using the RAR5 format.

Unix-like
 Calibre can view and convert to different formats.
 Comic Seer (Desktop) is a comic book archive viewer and organizer for the desktop.
 Evince, a document viewer, includes support for the format.
 Okular can view many formats, including PDF and CBR, and is included in the KDE Software Compilation.
 MuPDF is a cross-platform lightweight PDF, XPS, and E-book viewer.
 Zathura supports this format (as well as PDF, PostScript and others).

See also 
 Comparison of image viewers

References

External links 
 

 

Computer file formats
Ebooks
Comics formats